is a Japanese manga short story series written and illustrated by George Asakura. Each story depicts a relationship that revolves around the use of love letters. The stories were originally published by Kodansha in the shōjo (aimed at teenage girls) manga magazine Bessatsu Friend, and collected in two bound volumes. A Perfect Day for Love Letters received the Kodansha Manga Award for shōjo manga along with Oi Piitan!! by Risa Itou in 2005. A live action film adaptation premiered in Japan on December 4, 2004. It was also adapted into a Japanese television drama in 2014.

Manga 

In Japan, Kodansha published both tankōbon volumes in March 2001 ( and ). The series is licensed for an English language release in North America by Del Rey Manga. The first published in June 2005 and the second in November 2005.

Reception
Anime News Network's Carlo Santos criticizes the manga for its characters quirks for being annoying and "occasional clutter layout". However, he complimented the manga for "true-to-life characters". Mania.com's Mike Dungan criticises George Asakura's artwork as "coarse". However he commends the manga for "building the tension just right" in each of the individual stories.

References

External links
 Official Del Rey website
 Official NTV website
 
 

2001 manga
2004 films
2014 Japanese television series debuts
Kodansha manga
Del Rey Manga
Japanese romantic drama films
2000s Japanese-language films
Live-action films based on manga
Manga adapted into films
Nippon TV dramas
Romantic comedy anime and manga
Shōjo manga
Winner of Kodansha Manga Award (Shōjo)